Djupa andetag is the fifth album by Swedish singer Anni-Frid Lyngstad (her third album as 'Frida'), released exclusively in the Scandinavian region by Anderson Records on 20 September 1996. Tracks from this album, "Alla Mina Bästa År", "Ögonen" and "Även En Blomma", have been remixed for Frida – The Mixes.

Overview

Comeback and recording session
As chairperson for the Swedish organisation, "Det Naturliga Steget-Artister För Miljön" ("The Natural Step-Artists For The Environment"), Frida decided to record a mature album with lyrics dealing with "inner personal environment" and the nature's surroundings. Frida's composition, "Kvinnor Som Springer" ("Women Who Run"), was inspired by the book "Women who Run with the Wolves", by Clarissa Pinkola Estes. This is one of only a few songs in her career that Frida has written herself.

At the time of recording, Frida did not want the attention an international release would bring, but she also felt for singing in her mother tongue again. She asked Agnetha Fältskog to record "Alla mina bästa år" with her, but Fältskog declined citing fear of ABBA reunion rumours. Recorded in the Swedish language, the recording sessions took place from 18 March to 9 August 1996 in numerous studios in Stockholm including Polar Studios, Sveriges Radio Studio and Cirkus. A one-hour documentary of the making, video clips and recording of the album (titled 'Frida – mitt i livet') was broadcast on Sveriges Television. It is also available on the DVD set, Frida – The DVD, including interviews with Frida and producer Anders Glenmark.

Reception

Djupa andetag was met with a favorable reception, with critics citing the theme and Lyngstad's approach to singing on the album as positives. Critic Bruce Eder of AllMusic has praised Lyngstad for her 'relatively low-wattage' voice, the content and her vocal style on the album as 'more expressive and personal than any of her singing on those earlier records', as well as noting that it was a mature step for the singer and commenting, on her singing's volume, that 'less is more'.

Track listing

Personnel 
According to Anderson Records:

Musicians
Frida – lead and backing vocals
Anders Glenmark – backing vocals, guitar, keyboards, bass guitar, mellotron, drum programming
Marie Fredriksson – vocals in Alla mina bästa år
Karin Glenmark – backing vocals
Katarina Nordström – backing vocals
Christer Jansson – drums, percussion
Johan Lindström – guitar
Jonas Isacsson – guitar and twelve-string guitar
SNYKO [Stockholms Nya Kammarorkester] – strings

Production
Anders Glenmark – producer
Åsa Winzell – mastering
Lennart Östlund – engineer
Anders Hägglöf – assistant engineer
Mia Lorentzson – assistant engineer

Charts

Certifications

References

1996 albums
Anni-Frid Lyngstad albums
Albums recorded at Polar Studios